Jamie Paul Hart (born 31 December 1975) is a former English cricketer.  Hart was a right-handed batsman who bowled right-arm medium pace.  The son of football manager Paul Hart, he was born in Blackpool, Lancashire.

Hart made his debut for Nottinghamshire in a List A match against Somerset in 1995.  He represented the county in one further List A match during 1995, which came against Sussex.  The following season he played his only first-class match for the county against Yorkshire in the County Championship.  In his only first-class match, he scored an unbeaten 18 runs and bowled 18 wicket-less overs.

In 2001, he represented the Nottinghamshire Cricket Board in 2 List A matches against Bedfordshire in the 2001 Cheltenham & Gloucester Trophy and Oxfordshire in the 1st round of the 2002 Cheltenham & Gloucester Trophy which was held in 2001.  At the same time, he also played 2 List A matches for the Leicestershire Cricket Board in the same rounds of the same competition's against the Warwickshire Cricket Board and the Kent Cricket Board.  In his combined total of 6 List A matches, he scored 13 runs at a batting average of 3.25, with a high score of 10.  With the ball he took 6 wickets at a bowling average of 42.50, with best figures of 3/36.

After retiring early from cricket due to injury he became a football agent and has represented several high profile English players.

References

External links
Jamie Hart at Cricinfo
Jamie Hart at CricketArchive

1975 births
Living people
Sportspeople from Blackpool
English cricketers
Nottinghamshire cricketers
Nottinghamshire Cricket Board cricketers
Leicestershire Cricket Board cricketers